Inkvaders is an alien invasion game for the iPhone.

Summary
A hand drawn hero has to protect Earth from Martians. The hero can choose from a laser, a gun, and a rocket launcher as weapons and can use a jet pack. The Martians can only shoot their lasers at close range. The hero can collect power-ups to purchase weapons, ammo, health, and jet pack fuel. Game is no longer on the app store.

Reception
Robert Workman, of Modojo, said that the game reminds him of 1950s sci-fi, has a good soundtrack, and that he enjoys seeing the aliens explode. His problems with it is that the game is repetitive and that the later levels are really hard. An appVersity reviewer said that they liked the game, but thinks that it's hard to believe that games like this are a hit.

References

2009 video games
Alien invasions in video games
IOS games
IOS-only games
Science fiction video games
Single-player video games
Video games about extraterrestrial life
Chillingo games